Pawnee Rock Township is a township in Barton County, Kansas, United States.  As of the 2010 census, its population was 373.

Pawnee Rock Township was organized in 1878.

Geography
According to the USGS, it contains two cemeteries: Bergtal and Pawnee Rock.

References
 USGS Geographic Names Information System (GNIS)

External links
 US-Counties.com
 City-Data.com

Townships in Barton County, Kansas
Townships in Kansas